Muhammad Shah Firdaus Sahrom (born 26 November 1995) is a Malaysian racing cyclist. He rode in the men's sprint event at the 2018 UCI Track Cycling World Championships. He won the 2021 Australian Track National Championship in the keirin event, defeating fellow compatriot Azizulhasni Awang. He had participated in both Sprint and Keirin cycling events during the 2020 Summer Olympics in Tokyo. He competed at the 2022 Commonwealth Games in the Keirin event where he won a bronze medal and in the sprint event.

Biography
Shah Firdaus was born in Muar, Johor, Malaysia, where he and his family hails from the Kampung Parit Setongkat.

References

External links

 

1995 births
Living people
Johor
Malaysian people of Malay descent
Malaysian Muslims
Malaysian male cyclists
Malaysian track cyclists
Olympic cyclists of Malaysia
Cyclists at the 2020 Summer Olympics
Asian Games medalists in cycling
Cyclists at the 2018 Asian Games
Asian Games silver medalists for Malaysia
Cyclists at the 2018 Commonwealth Games
20th-century Malaysian people
21st-century Malaysian people
Cyclists at the 2022 Commonwealth Games
Commonwealth Games bronze medallists for Malaysia
Commonwealth Games medallists in cycling
Medallists at the 2022 Commonwealth Games